Mahmoud Alavi was an Iranian military officer who served as the Commander of the Islamic Republic of Iran Navy from 1979 to summer 1980. He was retired in 1976 under Kamal Habibollahi but was recalled to duty after Iranian Revolution. In July 1980, he was detained on charges of conspiracy and maintaining secret connections to the American officials. He was sentenced to eight years of imprisonment in February 1981 but was released on 27 July 1982.

Personal life
Alavi was a non-religious person.

References

Commanders of Islamic Republic of Iran Navy
Year of birth missing
Possibly living people